Shotru is a 2011 Indian Bengali-language action film by Ashoked by Raj Chakraborty and stars Jeet, Supriyo Dutta and Nusrat Jahan, who gave her debut by this film. This film was produced by Ashok Dhanuka of Eskay Movies who also distributed it. The movie is a remake of the Tamil film Singam  which stars Surya and Anushka Shetty.Shotru got released on 3 June 2011 along with another big release Paglu starring Dev and Koyel Mullick. Both the films turned out to be Hits. The film was dubbed into Hindi as "Ek Policewale Ki Taaqat".

Synopsis

Dibakar Singha (Jeet) is a police sub-inspector from Hridaypur, a small fictional town in the Birbhum district of Bengal. He is loved and respected by the entire town. Arjun Sarkar (Supriyo Dutta) deals in real estate as a cover, but is in fact a kidnapper and extortionist from Howrah who terrorizes the citizens and has the police on his payroll. Once Dibakar learns of Arjun's actions, he goes after him and kills Arjun's men one by one, including Arjun's younger brother.

During the same time, Dibakar falls in love with Puja (Nusrat Jahan), a beautiful young girl who comes to the city to visit her grandfather on vacation. Dibakar is initially frustrated with the level of corruption in the police department and wants to quit, but Puja manages to instill the call of duty in him, telling him, "Fight or you will be a loser." Dibakar continues his hunt to bring down Arjun Sarkar with renewed vigo, nd proves Arjun to be responsible for 62 kidnappings.

Dibakar is promoted to the head of an anti-kidnapping squad by the Home Minister. He conducts raids on Arjun's hideout, nd imprisons Arjun's brother Karna under false allegations. To free his brother, Arjun plans to kidnap Puja's younger sister, Diya, but Dibakar foils the attempt by catching two of the kidnappers. Dibakar tricks one kidnapper into confessing that they were hired by Arjun to commit the crime. Dibakar gets the much-needed evidence to prove Arjun is behind all the kidnappings happening in the town. He announces in the press that two kidnappers have been arrested and the money was recovered. The money will be declared as government assets unless someone comes forward to claim it. Many people come forward to claim their stake in the ransom money. Finding himself on the verge of being exposed, Arjun plans to send one of his plants to lure Dibakar to his den and kill him. Dibakar uncovers the real intent of Arjun's plant,which comes to the police station to file a false report, by tracing her mobile phone records to Arjun. He goes to the meeting place along with one of his police officers in disguise and kills Ratan, Arjun's closest aide.

Dibakar then informs Arjun that Ratan has agreed to be a state witness against him. Arjun sends Karna to finish Ratan in the hospital. This is a trick played by Dibakar to force Arjun into committing something foolish. Dibakar kills Karna while Arjun is on the phone with him. This act angers Arjun, who swears to kill all of Dibakar's nearest and dearest. He attempts to kill Puja, but she escapes with a bullet wound in her arm. Dibakar then reveals that his boss, the DSP (Biplab Chatterjee), is Arjun's mole in the police department. Having been exposed, the DSP has no choice but to help Dibakar in exposing Arjun.

Arjun kidnaps the daughter of the Assam Home Minister and takes her to Jharkhand. Dibakar pursues him and kills Arjun.

At the police ceremony to congratulate Dibakar, he announces that he has decided to return to his own village, saying that he has finished what he came to do in the city. Puja is shown accompanying him on this journey.

Cast
 Jeet as Sub-Inspector Dibakar Singha
 Nusrat Jahan as Puja
 Supriyo Dutta as real estate agent and kidnapping head Arjun Sarkar, who tends himself to rule in Howrah supported by politicians
 Saayoni Ghosh as Puja's sister
 Dipankar De as Sudhakar Singha
 Raja Dutta as Karna Sarkar
 Biplab Chatterjee as DSP
 Kharaj Mukherjee as Bhajan Babu
 Biswajit Chakraborty as Mahendra Chowdhury (Puja's father)
 Haradhan Bandopadhyay as Puja's grandfather
 Pradip Mukherjee as a businessman
 Raj Chakraborty in a cameo appearance

Soundtrack

The music of the film is composed by Indradeep Dasgupta, with lyrics by Srijato.

listing boxx office
The film was critically acclaimed by critics and was declared a 'Superhit' at Box Office. The dialogue from Jeet's Dibakar Singha, "Ami Kono Ishwar noiJee chere debo aar Rakshosh noyJee mere debo. Ami holam Police... saala chara aar maarar majhkhane lotke rekhe debo" (I am neither a God who will release nor a monster who will kill. I am Police... I will hang you scoundrel between releasing and killing.) became very popular among the audience.

World television premiere
The film had its world television premiere on Zee Bangla on 25 March 2012atn 7at :00 pm I.S.T.

References

External links
 

2011 films
Bengali-language Indian films
2010s Bengali-language films
Bengali remakes of Tamil films
Fictional portrayals of the West Bengal Police
Singam (film series)
Films directed by Raj Chakraborty
Films scored by Indradeep Dasgupta